Kalle Olsson (born 1984) is a Swedish politician, journalist and member of the Riksdag, the national legislature. A member of the Social Democratic Party, he has represented Jämtland County since September 2014.

Olsson is the son of bus driver Ruben Olsson and the nurse Kajsa Olsson. He was educated in Östersund. He studied political science at the Mid Sweden University and Stockholm University. He has worked as a cleaner and a lifeguard at the swimming pool in Östersund. He was a sports reporter at the Östersunds-Posten and political editor at the Länstidningen Östersund.

References

1984 births
Living people
Members of the Riksdag 2014–2018
Members of the Riksdag 2018–2022
Members of the Riksdag 2022–2026
Members of the Riksdag from the Social Democrats
Mid Sweden University alumni
Stockholm University alumni
Swedish journalists